Sam Adams (born June 13, 1973) is a former American football defensive tackle who played in the National Football League (NFL) for 14 seasons. He played college football at Texas A&M, where he earned consensus All-American honors, and was selected eighth overall by the Seattle Seahawks in the 1994 NFL Draft. Following six seasons as a member of the Seahawks, he earned consecutive Pro Bowl selections and All-Pro honors during his two seasons with the Baltimore Ravens. Adams was also part of the team that won a Super Bowl title in Super Bowl XXXV and made another championship appearance in his one season for the Oakland Raiders in 2002. As a member of the Buffalo Bills from 2003 to 2004, Adams was named to a third Pro Bowl. He spent his last two seasons with Cincinnati Bengals and Denver Broncos.

Early years
Adams was born in Houston, Texas to former NFL offensive guard Sam Adams Sr.  He attended Cypress Creek High School in Houston, and he was part of the Cypress Creek Cougars defense that included fellow future NFL player Dan Neil.  At Cy-Creek, Adams was not only the Prep Southwest Defensive Player of the Year in football, but a state champion in the shot put, placing second in the nation among high school track and field athletes.

College career
Adams attended Texas A&M University, where he was a starter for the Texas A&M Aggies football team for three years.  He was the Southwest Conference (SWC) Newcomer of the Year as a freshman in 1991 and a first-team freshman All-American.  He was a first-team All-SWC selection in 1992 after making 56 tackles, including 4.5 quarterback sacks.

In his junior year, 1993, he led the team in  tackles for loss (13), sacks (10.5), forced fumbles (5), and fumble recoveries (3), while making 78 tackles.  He was recognized as a consensus first-team All-American, and was named national defensive player of the year by Sports Illustrated.  He was also the Southwest Conference defensive player of the year, as well as the runner-up for the Lombardi Award. He finished his Texas A&M football career with 169 total tackles, 23 tackles for a loss, 20.5 sacks, seven forced fumbles, three fumble recoveries, and two interceptions.

He was also a member of the Texas A&M track team, throwing the shot and discus and for his accomplishments on the track and on the gridiron, Adams was inducted into the Texas A&M Hall of Fame in 2001.

Professional career

He made several starts during his rookie year, splitting time between defensive tackle and defensive end. In his second season, he sacked Mark Brunell of the Jacksonville Jaguars for a safety, scoring his first points of his professional career. He also blocked a field goal in overtime against the Arizona Cardinals. He played several more years for Seattle, making the AFC Pro Bowl team as an alternate in 1997. In 2000 he signed as a free agent with the Baltimore Ravens, and helped lead the most dominant defense in the league to a victory in Super Bowl XXXV. That season, he was also named as a starter in the Pro Bowl for the first time, a feat he would repeat the following season.

In 2002, he was a free agent once again, and this time he signed with the Oakland Raiders. He started 14 of 16 games that season, missing one due to injury and played in the other game, but did not start. He was on the team that went to Super Bowl XXXVII.

In 2003, Adams signed with the Buffalo Bills as a free agent and helped anchor the defensive line there. His first game for Buffalo was a memorable one, as he registered a sack, two tackles, and an interception against Tom Brady that was returned for his second career touchdown. He was a Pro Bowl alternate in 2003 for the second time in his career.

On March 1, 2006, Adams was released by the Bills due to salary cap issues, 30 days later Adams signed a three-year contract with the Cincinnati Bengals, reuniting him with head coach Marvin Lewis, who was the defensive coordinator for the Ravens when Adams played for them.

Adams signed with the Denver Broncos on June 4, 2007. He was released on December 4, 2007.

NFL statistics

Key
 GP: games played
 COMB: combined tackles
 TOTAL: total tackles
 AST: assisted tackles
 SACK: sacks
 FF: forced fumbles
 FR: fumble recoveries
 FR YDS: fumble return yards 
 INT: interceptions
 IR YDS: interception return yards
 AVG IR: average interception return
 LNG: longest interception return
 TD: interceptions returned for touchdown
 PD: passes defensed

References

External links

Sam Adams profile by the Oakland Raiders

1973 births
Living people
All-American college football players
American Conference Pro Bowl players
American football defensive ends
American football defensive tackles
Baltimore Ravens players
Buffalo Bills players
Cincinnati Bengals players
Denver Broncos players
Oakland Raiders players
Seattle Seahawks players
Players of American football from Houston
Texas A&M Aggies football players